Celaenoteuthis is a genus of muensterellid stem-octopod from southern Germany. It is monotypic, with only type species C. incerta known.

References 

Taxa described in 1922
Octopuses
Prehistoric cephalopod genera